Breanna Myles (born February 18, 2003) is an American beauty pageant titleholder who was crowned Miss Teen USA 2021. Myles had previously been crowned Miss Florida Teen USA 2021, and became the first entrant from Florida to win Miss Teen USA.

Early life and education
Myles was born in Kentucky to a Dominican mother and African-American father, and moved to Florida at age seven. She was raised in Port St. Lucie, Florida, and graduated from high school in 2021, with a dual enrollment associate degree from Indian River State College. Prior to becoming Miss Teen USA, Myles was studying computer science and musical theatre at Florida State University and aspired to become a software engineer.

Pageantry
Myles first began her pageantry career at age 12. She first competed in Miss Florida Teen USA in 2020, where she placed as the third runner-up despite falling on stage. Myles later returned the following year, and ultimately was crowned Miss Florida Teen USA 2021. As Miss Florida Teen USA, she received the right to represent Florida at Miss Teen USA 2021.

Miss Teen USA 2021 was held on November 27, 2021, in Tulsa, Oklahoma. Myles went on to advance as a part of the Top 16, and later advanced into the Top 5 as well, before being crowned as the winner by outgoing titleholder Kiʻilani Arruda. With her win, Myles became the first entrant from Florida to ever be crowned Miss Teen USA.

References

2003 births
African-American beauty pageant winners
American beauty pageant winners
American people of Dominican Republic descent
Florida State University alumni
Indian River State College alumni
Living people
Miss Teen USA winners
People from Port St. Lucie, Florida